Kenneth Alan Ray (born November 27, 1974) is an American former professional baseball pitcher who played for the Atlanta Braves and Kansas City Royals. Ray made his MLB debut on July 10, for the Royals.

Early career
After briefly pitching for the Royals in 1999, Ray spent years battling arm problems while trying to work his way back onto a major league roster.

Back in the majors
In 2005, Ray started the season with the independent North Shore Spirit of the Can-Am League before being acquired by the Atlanta Braves organization. He spent the remainder of the season with the Triple-A Richmond Braves.

On April 6, following an injury to starter Horacio Ramírez, Ray was called up from the Richmond Braves, Atlanta's Triple-A affiliate. In his first appearance for Atlanta in 2006, he struck out Barry Bonds on 3 pitches.

He was claimed off waivers by the Royals in the 2006 offseason. Ray began the  season in Triple-A with the Omaha Royals. He was released on August 18, 2007. On August 30, he was signed by the Triple-A Nashville Sounds. 
Ray began  pitching for the Triple-A Potros de Tijuana of the Mexican League where he held a 6-3 record and a 3.65 ERA. Ray signed with the SK Wyverns of the Korea Baseball Organization where he finished 2008.

On May 27, 2009, Ray was signed by the Cleveland Indians, and assigned to their AAA affiliate Columbus Clippers.

By March, 2010, Ray was pitching for the La New Bears in the Chinese Professional Baseball League. In 2010 his ERA of 2.32 helped earn him a renewal, and Ray continued to play for the La New Bears (now the Lamigo Monkeys) through 2012 and again in 2014.  In 2013 he played in Mexico and then for Nippon Professional Baseball's Rakuten Golden Eagles, for whom he played again in 2015 and 2016.  In 2017 at the age of 42, Ray pitched for the Lamigo Monkeys' minor league team.

References

External links

Ken Ray at Pura Pelota (Venezuelan Professional Baseball League)
Career statistics and player information from Korea Baseball Organization

1974 births
Living people
American expatriate baseball players in Japan
American expatriate baseball players in Mexico
American expatriate baseball players in South Korea
American expatriate baseball players in Taiwan
Atlanta Braves players
Baseball players from Atlanta
Bravos de Margarita players
Columbus Clippers players
KBO League pitchers
Fresno Grizzlies players
Gulf Coast Royals players
High Desert Mavericks players
Huntsville Stars players
Kansas City Royals players
La New Bears players
Lamigo Monkeys players
Leones de Yucatán players
Long Island Ducks players
Major League Baseball pitchers
Mexican League baseball pitchers
Nashville Sounds players
Nippon Professional Baseball pitchers
North Shore Spirit players
Omaha Golden Spikes players
Omaha Royals players
People from Roswell, Georgia
Potros de Tijuana players
Richmond Braves players
Rockford Royals players
SSG Landers players
Tigres de Aragua players
American expatriate baseball players in Venezuela
Tohoku Rakuten Golden Eagles players
Wichita Wranglers players
Wilmington Blue Rocks players
Winston-Salem Warthogs players
Yuba-Sutter Gold Sox players